Rovanperä is a surname. Notable people with the surname include:

 Harri Rovanperä (born 1966), Finnish rally driver
 Kalle Rovanperä (born 2000), Finnish rally driver

Finnish-language surnames
Surnames of Finnish origin